Univision America (stylized as Univision AMerica) was a Spanish-language talk radio network produced and distributed by Univision Communications. It was launched on July 4, 2012 on 9 U.S. AM radio stations in California, Texas, Illinois, Nevada, and Florida. As of March 2014, it added one FM station in New York. The stations are all owned and operated by Univision Radio (now known as Uforia Audio Network). The network featured local, national and international news, weather and traffic updates, as well as shows focused on the issues that matter most to Hispanics.

In 2015, Univision America's roster of programs were gradually canceled in a restructuring effort. The AM network was deemed unprofitable and was retooled to a music and paid programming format. The network's website redirected to a local website of a lone Univision America affiliate in Los Angeles. While the former affiliates in Texas switched to a Spanish-language Contemporary Christian music format under the "Amor Celestial" branding, many other affiliates opted to keep the News/Talk format with up-to-date local headlines, weather, and sports scores as well as remnants of this network's programming.

All the stations that previously broadcast this network are now affiliated with Univision Deportes Radio, which launched in early 2017. In 2019, it was rebranded as TUDN Radio.

See also
 Univision Communications
 Univision Radio

References

External links
Official  Univision America website

Univision Radio Network stations
Defunct radio networks in the United States
Spanish-language radio stations in the United States
Radio stations established in 2012
Radio stations disestablished in 2015
Defunct radio stations in the United States